La'Isha ("For the Woman") is an Israeli lifestyle magazine for women. It has been published on a weekly basis since 1947, and is owned by Yedioth Ahronoth media group.

Since 1950, La'Isha has sponsored the annual Miss Israel beauty pageant.

See also
Israeli fashion

References

External links
  

1947 establishments in Mandatory Palestine
Beauty pageant owners
Magazines published in Israel
Magazines established in 1947
Weekly magazines
Women's magazines
Women's fashion magazines
Yedioth Ahronoth
Women in Israel